The blue whale (Balaenoptera musculus) is a marine mammal and a baleen whale. The blue whale's long and slender body can be of various shades of greyish-blue dorsally and somewhat lighter underneath. Four subspecies are recognized: B. m. musculus in the North Atlantic and North Pacific, B. m. intermedia in the Southern Ocean, B. m. brevicauda (the pygmy blue whale) in the Indian Ocean and South Pacific Ocean, B. m. indica in the Northern Indian Ocean. There is also a population in the waters off Chile that may constitute a fifth subspecies.

In general, blue whale populations migrate between their summer feeding areas near the poles and their winter breeding grounds near the tropics. There is also evidence of year-round residencies, and partial or age/sex-based migration. Blue whales are filter feeders; their diet consists almost exclusively of krill. They are generally solitary or gather in small groups, and have no well-defined social structure other than mother-calf bonds. The fundamental frequency for blue whale vocalizations ranges from 8 to 25 Hz and the production of vocalizations may vary by region, season, behavior, and time of day. Orcas are their only natural predators.

The blue whale was once abundant in nearly all the Earth's oceans until the end of the 19th century. It was hunted almost to the point of extinction by whalers until the International Whaling Commission banned all blue whale hunting in 1966. The International Union for Conservation of Nature has listed blue whales as Endangered as of 2018. It continues to face numerous man-made threats such as ship strikes, pollution, ocean noise and climate change.

Taxonomy

Nomenclature 
The genus name, Balaenoptera, means winged whale while the species name, musculus, could mean "muscle" or a diminutive form of "mouse", possibly a pun by Carl Linnaeus when he named the species in Systema Naturae. One of the first published descriptions of a blue whale comes from Robert Sibbald's Phalainologia Nova, after Sibbald found a stranded whale in the estuary of the Firth of Forth, Scotland, in 1692. The name "blue whale" was derived from the Norwegian "blåhval", coined by Svend Foyn shortly after he had perfected the harpoon gun. The Norwegian scientist G. O. Sars adopted it as the common name in 1874.

Blue whales were referred to as 'Sibbald's rorqual', after Robert Sibbald, who first described the species. Herman Melville called the blue whale "sulphur bottom" in his novel Moby Dick because of the accumulation of diatoms creating a yellowish appearance on their pale underside.

Evolution

Blue whales are rorquals in the family Balaenopteridae.
The earliest discovered anatomically modern blue whale is a partial skull fossil found in southern Italy, dating to the Early Pleistocene, roughly 1.5–1.25 million years ago. The Australian pygmy blue whale diverged during the Last Glacial Maximum. Their more recent divergence has resulted in the subspecies having a relatively low genetic diversity, and New Zealand blue whales have an even lower genetic diversity.

Whole genome sequencing suggests that blue whales are most closely related to sei whales with gray whales as a sister group. This study also found significant gene flow between minke whales and the ancestors of the blue and sei whale. Blue whales also displayed high genetic diversity.

Hybridization
Blue whales are known to interbreed with fin whales. The earliest description of a possible hybrid between a blue and fin whale was a  anomalous female whale with the features of both the blue and the fin whales taken in the North Pacific. A whale captured off northwestern Spain in 1984, was found to have been the product of a blue whale mother and a fin whale father. 

Two live blue-fin whale hybrids have since been documented in the Gulf of St. Lawrence, (Canada), and in the Azores, (Portugal). DNA tests done in Iceland on a blue whale killed in July 2018 by the Icelandic whaling company Hvalur hf, found that the whale was the offspring of a male fin whale and female blue whale; however, the results are pending independent testing and verification of the samples. Because the International Whaling Commission classified blue whales as a "Protection Stock", trading their meat is illegal, and the kill is an infraction that must be reported. Blue-fin hybrids have been detected from genetic analysis of whale meat samples taken from Japanese markets. Blue-fin whale hybrids are capable of being fertile. Molecular tests on a  pregnant female whale caught off Iceland in 1986 found that it had a blue whale mother and a fin whale father, while its fetus was sired by a blue whale.

There is reference to a humpback-blue whale hybrid in the South Pacific, attributed to marine biologist Michael Poole.

Subspecies and stocks
At least four subspecies of blue whale are recognized, some of which are divided into population stocks or "management units". They have a worldwide distribution, but are mostly absent from the Arctic Ocean and the Mediterranean, Okhotsk, and Bering Sea.

Northern subspecies (B. m. musculus)
North Atlantic population - This population is mainly documented from New England along eastern Canada to Greenland, particularly in the Gulf of St. Lawrence, during summer though some individuals may remain there all year. They also aggregate near Iceland and have increased their presence in the Norwegian Sea. They are reported to migrate south to the West Indies, the Azores and northwest Africa. 
Eastern North Pacific population - Whales in this region mostly feed off California from summer to fall and then Oregon, Washington State, the Alaska Gyre and Aleutian Islands later in the fall. During winter and spring, blue whales migrate south to the waters of Mexico, mostly the Gulf of California, and the Costa Rica Dome, where they both feed and breed.
Central/Western Pacific population - This stock is documented around the Kamchatka Peninsula during the summer; some individuals may remain there year-round. They have been recorded wintering in Hawaiian waters, though some can be found in the Gulf of Alaska during fall and early winter.
Northern Indian Ocean subspecies (B. m. indica) - This subspecies can be found year-round in the northwestern Indian Ocean, though some individuals have recorded travelling to the Crozet Islands during between summer and fall.
Pygmy blue whale (B. m. brevicauda)
Madagascar population - This population migrates between the Seychelles and Amirante Islands in the north and the Crozet Islands and Prince Edward Islands in the south were they feed, passing through the Mozambique Channel. 
Australia/Indonesia population - Whales in this region appear to winter off Indonesia and migrate to their summer feeding grounds off the coast of Western Australia, with major concentrations at Perth Canyon and an area stretching from the Great Australian Bight and Bass Strait.
Eastern Australia/New Zealand population - This stock may reside in the Tasman Sea and the Lau Basin in winter and feed mostly in the South Taranaki Bight and off the coast of eastern North Island. Blue whales have been detected around New Zealand throughout the year.
Antarctic subspecies (B. m. intermedia) - This subspecies includes all populations found around the Antarctic. They have been recorded to travel as far north as eastern tropical Pacific, the central Indian Ocean, and the waters of southwestern Australia and northern New Zealand.

Blue whales off the Chilean coast may be a separate subspecies based on geographic separation, genetics, and unique song types. Chilean blue whales may overlap in the Eastern Tropical Pacific with Antarctica blue whales and Eastern North Pacific blue whales. Chilean blue whales are genetically differentiated from Antarctica blue whales and are unlikely to be interbreeding. However, the genetic distinction is less with the Eastern North Pacific blue whale and there may be gene flow between hemispheres.

Description

The blue whale is a slender-bodied cetacean with a broad U-shaped head; thin, elongated flippers; a small  sickle-shaped dorsal fin located close to the tail and a large tail stock at the root of the wide and thin flukes. The upper jaw is lined with 70–395 black baleen plates. The throat region has 60–88 grooves which allows the skin to expand during feeding. It has two blowholes that can squirt  up in the air. The skin has a mottled grayish-blue coloration, appearing blue underwater. The mottling patterns near the dorsal fin vary between individuals. The underbelly has lighter pigmentation and can appear yellowish due to diatoms in the water, which historically earned them the nickname "sulphur bottom".

Size 

The blue whale is the largest animal known ever to have existed. Female blue whales are larger than males. Hydrodynamic models suggest a blue whale could not exceed 108 ft (33 m) because of metabolic and energy constraints.

In the Northern Hemisphere, males weigh an average  and females . Eastern North Pacific blue whale males average  and females . Antarctic males average  and females .

Life span 
Blue whales live around 80–90 years or more. Scientists look at a blue whale's earwax or ear plug to estimate its age. Each year, a light and dark layer of wax is laid corresponding with fasting during migration and feeding time. Each set is thus an indicator of age. The oldest blue whale determined using this method was 110 years old. The maximum age of a pygmy blue whale determined this way is 73 years. In addition, female blue whales develop scars or corpora albicantia on their ovaries every time they ovulate. In a female pygmy blue whale, one corpus albicans is formed on average every 2.6 years.

Behavior

The blue whale is usually solitary, but can be found in pairs. When productivity is high enough, blue whales can be seen in gatherings of more than 50 individuals. Populations may go on long migrations, traveling to their summer feeding grounds towards the poles and then heading to their winter breeding grounds in more equatorial waters. The animals appear to use memory to locate the best feeding areas. There is evidence of alternative strategies, such as year-round residency, and partial (where only some individuals migrate) or age/sex-based migration. Some whales have been recorded feeding in breeding grounds. The traveling speed for blue whales ranges . 

Their theoretical aerobic dive limit was estimated at 31.2 minutes, however, the longest dive measured was 15.2 minutes. A blue whale's heart rate can drop to 2 beats per minute (bpm) at deep depths, but upon surfacing, can rise to 37 bpm, which is close to its peak heart rate.

Diet and feeding

The blue whale's diet consists almost exclusively of krill. Blue whales capture krill through lunge feeding, they swim towards them at high speeds as they open their mouths up to 80° They may engulf  of water at one time. They squeeze the water out through their baleen plates with pressure from the throat pouch and tongue, and swallow the remaining krill. Blue whales have been recorded making 180° rolls during lunge-feeding, possibly allowing them to search the prey field and find the densest patches.

While pursuing krill patches, blue whales maximize their calorie intake by increasing the number of lunges while selecting the thickest patches. This provides them enough energy for everyday activities while storing additional energy necessary for migration and reproduction. Blue whales have to engulf densities greater than 100 krill/m3 to maintain the cost of lunge feeding. They can consume  from one mouthful of krill, which can provide up to 240 times more energy than used in a single lunge. It is estimated that an average-sized blue whale must consume  of krill a day.

Blue whales appear to avoid directly competing with other baleen whales. Different whale species select different feeding spaces and times as well as different prey species. In the Southern Ocean, baleen whales appear to feed on Antarctic krill of different sizes, which may lessen competition between them.

Reproduction and birth

Blue whales generally reach sexual maturity at 8–10 years. Male pygmy blue whales average  at sexual maturity. Little is known about mating behavior, or breeding and birthing areas. Blue whales appear to be polygynous, with males competing for females. A male blue whale typically trails a female and will fight off potential rivals. The species mates from fall to winter. 

Pregnant females eat roughly four percent of their body weight daily, amounting to 60% of their overall body weight throughout summer foraging periods. The first video of a calf thought to be nursing was filmed in New Zealand in 2016. They gain roughly  during the weaning period. Interbirth periods last two to three years, they average 2.6 years in pygmy blue whales.

Vocalizations

Blue whales produce some of the loudest and lowest frequency vocalizations in the animal kingdom, and their inner ears appear well adapted for detecting low-frequency sounds. The fundamental frequency for blue whale vocalizations ranges from 8 to 25 Hz. Blue whale songs vary between populations. 

Vocalizations produced by the Eastern North Pacific population have been well studied. This population produces pulsed calls ("A") and tonal calls ("B"), upswept tones that precede type B calls ("C") and separate downswept tones ("D"). A and B calls are often produced in repeated co-occurring sequences and sung only by males, suggesting a reproductive function. D calls may have multiple functions. They are produced by both sexes during social interactions while feeding. and by males when competing for mates. 

Blue whale calls recorded off Sri Lanka have a three‐unit phrase. The first unit is a 19.8 to 43.5 Hz pulsive call, and is normally 17.9 ± 5.2 seconds long. The second unit is a 55.9 to 72.4 Hz FM upsweep that is 13.8 ± 1.1 seconds long. The final unit is 28.5 ± 1.6 seconds long with a tone of 108 to 104.7 Hz. A blue whale call recorded off Madagascar, a two‐unit phrase, consists of 5–7 pulses with a center frequency of 35.1 ± 0.7 Hz lasting 4.4 ± 0.5 seconds proceeding a 35 ± 0 Hz tone that is 10.9 ± 1.1 seconds long. In the Southern Ocean, blue whales produce 18-second vocals which start with a 9-second-long, 27 Hz tone, and then a 1-second downsweep to 19 Hz, followed by a downsweep further to 18 Hz. Other vocalizations include 1–4 second long, frequency-modulated calls with a frequency of 80 and 38 Hz.

There is evidence that some blue whale songs have temporally declined in tonal frequency. The vocalization of blue whales in the Eastern North Pacific decreased in tonal frequency by 31% from the early 1960s to the early 21st century. The frequency of pygmy blue whales in the Antarctic has decreased by a few tenths of a hertz every year starting in 2002. It is possible that as blue whale populations recover from whaling, there is increasing sexual selection pressure (i.e., a lower frequency indicates a larger body size).

Predators and parasites
The only known natural predator to blue whales is the orca, although the rate of fatal attacks by orcas is unknown. Photograph-identification studies of blue whales have estimated that a high proportion of the individuals in the Gulf of California have rake-like scars, indicative of encounters with orcas. Off southeastern Australia, 3.7% of blue whales photographed had rake marks and 42.1% of photographed pygmy blue whales off Western Australia had rake marks. Documented predation by orcas has been rare. A blue whale mother and calf were first observed being chased at high speeds by orcas off southeastern Australia. The first documented attack occurred in 1977 off southwestern Baja California, Mexico, but the injured whale escaped after five hours. Four more blue whales were documented as being chased by a group of orcas between 1982 and 2003. The first documented predation event by orcas occurred in September 2003, when a group of orcas in the Eastern Tropical Pacific was encountered feeding on a recently killed blue whale calf. In March 2014, a commercial whale watch boat operator recorded an incident involving a group of orcas harassing a blue whale in Monterey Bay. The blue whale defended itself by slapping its tail. A similar incident was recorded by a drone in Monterey Bay in May 2017. The first direct observations of orca predation occurred off the south coast of Western Australia, two in 2019 and one more in 2021. The first victim was estimated to be  .

In Antarctic waters, blue whales accumulate diatoms of the species Cocconeis ceticola and the genera Navicola, which are normally removed when the whales enter warmer waters. Other external parasites include barnacles such as Coronula diadema, Coronula reginae and Cryptolepas rhachianecti, which latch on their skin deep enough to leave behind a pit if removed. Whale lice species make their home in cracks of the skin and are relatively harmless. The copepod species Pennella balaenopterae digs in and attaches itself to the blubber to feed on. Intestinal parasites include the trematode genera Ogmogaster and Lecithodesmus, the tapeworm genera Priapocephalus, Phyllobotrium, Tetrabothrius, Diphyllobotrium and Diplogonoporus and the thorny-headed worm genus Bolbosoma. In the North Atlantic, blue whales also contain the protozoans Entamoeba, Giardia and Balantidium.

Conservation
The global blue whale population is estimated to be 5,000–15,000 mature individuals and 10,000-25,000 total as of 2018. By comparison, there were at least 140,000 mature whales in 1926. There are an estimated total of 1,000–3,000 whales in the North Atlantic, 3,000–5,000 in the North Pacific and 5,000–8,000 in the Antarctic. There are possibly 1,000–3,000 whales in the eastern South Pacific while the pygmy blue whale may number 2,000–5,000 individuals. Blue whales have been protected in areas of the Southern Hemisphere since 1939. In 1955 they were given complete protection in the North Atlantic under the International Convention for the Regulation of Whaling; this protection was extended to the Antarctic in 1965 and the North Pacific in 1966. The protected status of North Atlantic blue whales was not recognized by Iceland until 1960. In the US, the species is protected under the Endangered Species Act.

Blue whales are formally classified as endangered under both the US Endangered Species Act and the IUCN Red List. They are also listed on Appendix I under the Convention on International Trade in Endangered Species of Wild Fauna and Flora (CITES) and the Convention on the Conservation of Migratory Species of Wild Animals. Although for some populations there is not enough information on current abundance trends (e.g., pygmy blue whales), others are critically endangered (e.g., Antarctic blue whales).

Threats

Blue whales were initially difficult to hunt because of their size and speed. This began to change in the mid-19th century with the development of harpoons that can be shot as projectiles. Blue whale whaling peaked between 1930 and 1931 with 30,000 animals taken. Harvesting of the species was particularly high in the Antarctic, with 350,000–360,000 whales taken in the first half of the 20th century. In addition, 11,000 North Atlantic whales (mostly around Iceland) and 9,500 North Pacific whales were killed during the same period. The International Whaling Commission banned all hunting of blue whales in 1966 and gave them worldwide protection. However, the Soviet Union continued to illegally hunt blue whales and other species through to the 1970s.

Ship strikes are a significant mortality factor for blue whales, especially off the U.S. West Coast, A total of 17 blue whales were killed or suspected to have been killed by ships between 1998 and 2019 off the US West Coast. Five deaths in 2007 off California were considered an unusual mortality event, as defined under the Marine Mammal Protection Act. Lethal ship strikes are also a problem in Sri Lankan waters, where their habitat intersects with one of the world's most active shipping routes. Here, strikes caused the deaths of eleven blue whales in 2010 and 2012, and at least two in 2014. Ship strike mortality claimed the lives of two blue whales off southern Chile in the 2010s. Possible measures for reducing future ship strikes include better predictive models of whale distribution, changes in shipping lanes, vessel speed reductions, and seasonal and dynamic management of shipping lanes. Few cases of blue whale entanglement in commercial fishing gear have been documented. The first report in the U.S. occurred off California in 2015, reportedly some type of deep-water trap/pot fishery. Three more entanglement cases were reported in 2016. In Sri Lanka, a blue whale was documented with a net wrapped through its mouth, along the sides of its body, and wound around its tail. 

Increasing man-made underwater noise impacts blue whales. They may be exposed to noise from commercial shipping and seismic surveys as a part of oil and gas exploration. Blue whales in the Southern California Bight decreased calling in the presence of mid-frequency active (MFA) sonar. Exposure to simulated MFA sonar was found to interrupt blue whale deep-dive feeding but no changes in behavior were observed in individuals feeding at shallower depths. The responses also depended on the animal's behavioral state, its (horizontal) distance from the sound source and the availability of prey.

The potential impacts of pollutants on blue whales is unknown. However, because blue whales feed low on the food chain, there is a lesser chance for bioaccumulation of organic chemical contaminants. Analysis of the earwax of a male blue whale killed by a collision with a ship off the coast of California showed contaminants like pesticides, flame retardants, and mercury. Reconstructed persistent organic pollutant (POP) profiles suggested that a substantial maternal transfer occurred during gestation and/or lactation. Male blue whales in the Gulf of St. Lawrence, Canada were found to have higher concentrations of PCBs, dichlorodiphenyltrichloroethane (DDT), metabolites, and several other organochlorine compounds relative to females, reflecting maternal transfer of these persistent contaminants from females into young.

See also 

 List of cetaceans
 List of largest mammals
 List of whale vocalizations

References

Further reading 

 
 
 NOAA Fisheries, Office of Protected Resources Blue whale biology & status

External links 

 Blue whale vocalizations – Cornell Lab of Ornithology—Bioacoustics Research Program (archived 26 February 2015)
 Blue whale video clips and news from the BBC – BBC Wildlife Finder
 Voices in the Sea – Sounds of the Blue Whale
 NOAA Stock Assessments
 Life of a Hunter: Blue Whale  – BBC America
 Living With Predators – BBC America

Blue whales
Mammals described in 1758
Conservation-reliant species
Cosmopolitan mammals
Biological records
ESA endangered species
Taxa named by Carl Linnaeus
Endangered Fauna of China